Nature's Great Events is a wildlife documentary series made for BBC television, first shown in the UK on BBC One and BBC HD in February 2009. The series looks at how seasonal changes powered by the sun cause shifting weather patterns and ocean currents, which in turn create the conditions for some of the planet's most spectacular wildlife events. Each episode focuses on the challenges and opportunities these changes present to a few key species.

Nature's Great Events was produced by the BBC Natural History Unit with the Discovery Channel and in association with Wanda Films. The British version of the series was narrated by David Attenborough. In United States, the series was shown under the alternative title Nature's Most Amazing Events beginning on 29 May 2009 and was narrated by Hasani Issa. In Australia, this program began airing on ABC1 each Sunday at 7:30pm from 14 June until 19 July 2009.

The title Nature's Great Events was previously used by Reader's Digest for an unrelated VHS series released in 1996.

Production

Production team 
The series was first unveiled as a co-production deal with independent Wanda Films, under the working title of Earth's Great Events. The title was subsequently revised and the Discovery Channel revealed as additional co-producers. The Natural History Unit's production team includes series producer Karen Bass and executive producer Brian Leith. The score was composed by Barnaby Taylor and Ben Salisbury, orchestrated and conducted by William Goodchild and performed by the BBC Concert Orchestra. Views of the earth from space, that illustrate the climatic events around the world, were created by design company Burrell Durrant Hifle incorporating NASA photography.

Filming 
Filming took place over a 25-month period, an unusually tight timescale for a natural history production of this scale. In some cases, the events were not guaranteed to occur every year, so working to such a rapid schedule meant that the film crews ran the risk of having nothing to film. Producer Karen Bass described the series as "a minor miracle, given the constraints of luck and timing - we were totally dependent on events happening when they were supposed to." One of the most challenging sequences to film was the climax of "The Great Tide" episode, featuring aerial and underwater footage of dolphins, sharks and gannets attacking a sardine shoal. In 2007, the sardine run didn't take place, and after weeks of fruitless searching, the crew had to give up. The following year, there was a second and final opportunity. Just in case they were unsuccessful again, the producers devised an alternative sixth episode which would have explored the science behind seasonal changes, looking at how the "Great Events" are triggered and how environmental change may be affecting them. As luck would have it, the sardine run returned for the first time in three years and the team captured the shots they needed.

Television firsts 
The BBC claimed a number of TV firsts achieved by the production team. Many of the filming techniques first used on Planet Earth, such as the gyroscopically-stabilised helicopter camera known as the Heligimbal, were adopted again, along with new technology. In "The Great Tide", some of the surface-water footage was shot from a boat-mounted stabilised camera, previously used in the Hollywood film industry. Innovations on "The Great Flood" included FrankenCam, a motion-control macro camera developed by Ammonite Films and capable of shooting extreme close-ups of tiny subjects. The team were also the first to film narwhals from the air and the first to reveal how grizzly bears use their feet to scoop up dead salmon from deep pools. The crew of "The Great Migration" had the good fortune of witnessing the first eruption of a Tanzanian volcano in 40 years, and managed to shoot aerial footage of the event.

Episodes 

{{Episode table |background=#3198FF |overall=|title= |airdate= |viewers= |country=UK |titleT=Original title / Discovery Channel title |episodes=

{{Episode list
 |EpisodeNumber   =  2
 |Title           = The Great Salmon Run
 |AltTitle        = Grizzly Wilderness
 |OriginalAirDate = 
 |Viewers         = 4.45 million viewers (18.7% audience share) |ShortSummary    = The subject of the second programme is the annual salmon run on the west coast of North America. Hundreds of millions of Pacific salmon return to the mountain streams in which they were born, where they will spawn and then die. Their passage upstream is fraught with danger, from rapids, waterfalls and hungry grizzly bears. The programme begins at the arrival of spring, with a grizzly mother leading her cubs down from their winter den in the Alaskan mountains. The bears congregate in the forested valleys, where they forage for whatever food they can find. Survival is tough for all, as shown by a pack of hungry wolves attacking an adult grizzly. It is not until July that the salmon arrive in great numbers [possible CGI]. Other predators join the feast, including orcas, Steller sea lions, salmon sharks and the bald headed eagle. Those that make it past the bears risk becoming trapped in shallow reaches as the water level subsides. Relief comes as a summer storm replenishes the streams, triggered by moist ocean air rising over the coastal mountains. As they reach the spawning grounds, the salmon change body shape and colour in preparation for spawning. When it is over, the fish are close to exhaustion and they die en masse, providing an easy meal for birds and lingering bears. Their deaths are not in vain, for the nutrients from their decaying bodies help to fertilise the soil, sustaining the forests of tall pines.

The diary piece, "Close Encounters of a Grizzly Kind", reveals how footage of the bears fishing using their feet was obtained.      
 |LineColor       = 3198FF
}}

}}

 Reception 
The series drew an average of 4.0 million viewers and a 16.9% audience share, down on BBC One's average share of 24% for the same time slot in 2008. However, the Sunday evening repeats at a more family-friendly viewing time drew similar viewing figures to the first broadcast, and the episodes regularly featured in the top ten weekly chart on BBC iPlayer.

The series received almost universal praise in the British press. Writing in The Guardian of the scene in which a humpback whale swallows a shoal of herring, Lucy Mangan commented: "You can cradle your jaw safely in your lap for the rest of the evening, as you replay that moment in your mind's eye and reel at the slower but no less staggering evocation by the entire programme, the entire series, of the incredible force and fragility of it all." The sequence was also singled out by Tim Teeman in The Times, who wrote "now that was a money shot. Nature's Great Events: "The Great Feast" was no mis-sale". He went on to describe it as "the most surprising bit of television this week" and "the most mind-blowing, horrific and beautiful sequence of film". The series also gained a very favourable review in The Scotsman. Its critic Paul Whitelaw described it as "quite simply wonderful television. Visually stunning, immersive and mesmerising, it examined some of the most dramatic wildlife spectacles on Earth with characteristic verve and insight." He singled out praise for David Attenborough, noting that "even when he is merely narrating, [he] is quite brilliant at what he does, and I defy anyone to refute that."

Matt Warman of The Daily Telegraph was complimentary about the "wealth of surprising, beautiful images", but criticised the series for its superficial treatment of environmental issues. Writing about the plight of polar bears highlighted in "The Great Melt", he commented "it was tempting to ask whether the rise of one species, man, and the decline of another could not be considered a sad part of evolution by natural selection... Nature's Great Events, however, chose not to engage with the debate."

 Merchandise 
DVD and Blu-ray
In United Kingdom, DVD has been released on 16 March 2009 (BBCDVD2863), while Blu-ray Disc was later released on 15 June 2009 by 2 Entertain. Both DVD and Blu-ray includes with ten-minute feature called "Nature's Great Events Diaries" which details the filming of a particular event after each episode.

In United States and Canada, both DVD and Blu-ray Disc was released under the title "Nature's Most Amazing Events" on 2 June 2009 by BBC Warner.

In Australia and New Zealand, DVD and Blu-ray was also released by ABC DVD/Village Roadshow on 6 August 2009.

In Japan, both DVD and Blu-ray Disc were released on 4 June 2010, and it was distributed by Sony Pictures Entertainment Japan. However, it does not included Nature's Great Events Diaries like any other regions.

Books
In United Kingdom, an accompanying hardback book has been published by Mitchell Beazley on 2 February 2009. Called Nature's Great Events: The Most Spectacular Natural Events on the Planet, it is authored by the BBC Natural History Unit, edited by Karen Bass and has an introduction by Brian Leith.

The companion volume for the US market, Nature's Great Events: The Most Amazing Natural Events on the Planet, was published by the University of Chicago Press on 15 May 2009.

Soundtrack

The musical score and songs featured in the series were composed by Ben Salisbury and Barnaby Taylor with the performed by the BBC Concert Orchestra, and has been performed during "Nature's Great Events Live" as part of an event for the re-opening of Bristol's Colston Hall in the UK. The soundtrack was only available for digital release at iTunes Store on 9 September 2009.

 References 

https://web.archive.org/web/20170321105247/http://www.gosainpost.com/category/universe/
http://www.gosainpost.com/out-of-the-shadows-the-wildcats-youve-never-see/
http://www.gosainpost.com/category/animals/
http://www.gosainpost.com/bengal-tiger-panthera-tigris-tigris/

 External links Nature's Great Events at HuluNature's Great Events at Hulu JapanNature's Great Events on the EdenNature's Most Amazing Events'' at Discovery Channel
UK publisher's webpage for Nature's Great Events book
US publisher's webpage for Nature's Great Events: The Most Amazing Natural Events on the Planet
Review, Leicester Mercury

BBC television documentaries
BBC high definition shows
Documentary films about nature
2009 British television series debuts
2009 British television series endings
Discovery Channel original programming